The Yingtsai Academy is a former tutorial academy in Houlong Township, Miaoli County, Taiwan.

Architecture
The academy was designed with Southern Min architectural style with a cost of NT$91 million. It features a bridge, garden and pond.

Transportation
The academy is accessible within walking distance west of Miaoli Station of Taiwan High Speed Rail.

See also
 List of tourist attractions in Taiwan

References

Academies in Taiwan
Buildings and structures in Miaoli County
Tourist attractions in Miaoli County